Tales from the Loop is an American science fiction drama television series developed and written by Nathaniel Halpern based on the art book of the same name by Swedish artist Simon Stålenhag. The eight-episode first season was released in its entirety on Amazon Prime Video on April 3, 2020.

Series overview
Tales from the Loop follows the interconnected lives of the residents in the fictional town of Mercer, Ohio. Mercer is home to the Mercer Center for Experimental Physics, an underground facility known as the Loop. It is here that researchers attempt to "make the impossible possible".

Cast and characters

Main
 Rebecca Hall as Loretta, the mother of Jakob and Cole. She works alongside her husband George as a physicist at the Loop.
 Abby Ryder Fortson as Young Loretta
 Paul Schneider as George, the father of Jakob and Cole.
 Emjay Anthony as Young George
 Duncan Joiner as Cole, the youngest son of Loretta and George.
 Shane Carruth as Adult Cole
 Daniel Zolghadri as Jakob, the oldest son of Loretta and George.
 Jonathan Pryce as Russ, the founder of the Loop. He is also the father of George and the husband of Klara.

Recurring
 Jane Alexander as Klara, the wife of Russ and the mother of George.
 Tyler Barnhardt as Danny Jansson
 Ato Essandoh as Gaddis
 Nicole Law as May 
 Danny Kang as Ethan
 Christin Park as Stacey
 Dan Bakkedahl as Ed 
 Lauren Weedman as Kate 
 Alessandra de Sa Pereira as Beth 
 Leann Lei as Xiu 
 Dominic Rains as Lucas
 Jon Kortajarena as Alex 
 Brian Maillard as Kent 
 Elektra Kilbey as Alma
 Stefanie Estes as Sarah

Episodes

Production

Background 
Tales from the Loop is based on the 2014 narrative art book of the same name by Swedish artist Simon Stålenhag; also drawing inspiration from the fact Stålenhag never fully explains what the science fiction objects he depicts do or where they come from.

Development 
On July 17, 2018, it was announced that Amazon had given the production a series order for a first season consisting of eight episodes. Executive producers include Matt Reeves, Adam Kassan, Rafi Crohn, Nathaniel Halpern, Mark Romanek, Mattias Montero, Adam Berg, and Samantha Taylor Pickett. Halpern serves as showrunner and Romanek directed the pilot episode. Production companies involved with the series include 6th & Idaho, Indio, Amazon Studios, and Fox 21 Television Studios. The first season was released in its entirety on April 3, 2020. A first trailer was released on February that year.

Writer and showrunner Nathaniel Halpern drew inspiration from the short story cycle Winesburg, Ohio by Sherwood Anderson; its themes of loneliness and isolation, and its focus on small town characters. Executive producer and director Mark Romanek drew inspiration from the Dekalog, the 10-part series of television films by Krzysztof Kieślowski. Other directors cited to influence the production include Ingmar Bergman, Yasujirō Ozu, and Andrei Tarkovsky.

Filming 
The team, headed by visual effects producer Andrea Knoll, attempted to preserve the "painterly feeling" of Stålenhag's artwork, earning them an Emmy nomination for Outstanding Special Visual Effects in a Supporting Role. In his attempts to "crack the code" of Stålenhag, cinematographer Jeff Cronenweth chose to shoot night scenes during dusk instead.

Reception

Critical response
On Rotten Tomatoes, season 1 has a "certified fresh" approval rating of 86% based on 69 reviews, with an average rating of 7.2/10. The website's critical consensus reads: "Though the show around them burns a bit too slowly, Tales from the Loop beautifully transposes Simon Stålenhag's paintings into moving art and provides a welcome dose of warmth and humanity with its sci-fi." On Metacritic, season 1 has a score of 68/100 based on reviews from 15 critics.

David Baird from The B.C. Catholic characterizes the series as "a set of loosely interrelated meditations upon ephemerality, the impact of technology, and human vulnerability infused with a mild science fiction savour" and considers it "a beguiling fusion of forward-looking nostalgia". Joshua Thomas from The Michigan Daily simply considers it "superb sci-fi"; "exactly what good sci-fi should look like." Writing for Firstpost, Prahlad Srihari thinks its "wide shots, the symmetrical frames, and the play of light and space all do justice to Stålenhag's retrofuturistic vision". According to The Verges Joshua Rivera, "Tales from the Loop is so pretty it breaks your heart." Writing for /Film, Hoai-Tran Bui thinks the show explores "universal elements of grief, aging, parenthood, loneliness, and love" but also that it "often toes the line between beguiling and boring". Polygons Charlie Hall, meanwhile, was left "feeling uneasy and confused."

Awards and nominations

References

External links
 
 

2020 American television series debuts
2020 American television series endings
2020s American drama television series
2020s American science fiction television series
Amazon Prime Video original programming
English-language television shows
Fiction about body swapping
Television series by Touchstone Television
Television series by Amazon Studios
Television shows set in Ohio
Alternate history television series
Magic realism television series
Television series set in the 1980s
American alternate history
Robots in television